Williamstown is an unincorporated community in Decatur and Rush counties, in the U.S. state of Indiana.

History
Williamstown was founded in 1830. An old variant name of the community was called Earl City.

A post office was established at Williamstown in 1834, and remained in operation until it was discontinued in 1905.

Geography
Williamstown is located at the boundary between Decatur and Rush counties.

References

Unincorporated communities in Decatur County, Indiana
Unincorporated communities in Rush County, Indiana
Unincorporated communities in Indiana
1830 establishments in Indiana